Aleksandar Davić (born 1961 in Novi Sad, Yugoslavia, died 2020 in Belgrade, Serbia) was a Serbian film director and screenwriter.

Biography
Davić's works examined avant-garde and neoavant-garde artistic practices. He directed music videos for different Yugoslav rock bands. He made video art, experimental videos and for his fictions Davić has written screenplays. His feature film Žurka (The Party) won the Best screenplay award in Serbia in 2005 and the Best Film Award at the Festival du Film Serbe 2006 Paris. He was a full professor of Film and Theatre Directing at the Academy of Arts University of Novi Sad and a professor of Digital Video at Interdisciplinary studies University of Arts in Belgrade.

Filmography
My Spain, documentary, prod. TVNS, 1986
Clients, documentary, prod. TVNS, 1987
New Year's Train, documentary, prod. TVNS, 1988
Northern border without a number, documentary, prod. TVNS, 1989
Dunafalvi March, documentary, prod. Terra Film, 1990
Prince of Chaos, music video, prod. 3P, 1990 
Punishment and Freedom, documentary, prod. TVNS, 1991
Garden, experimental film, prod. TVNS, 1991
The Last Dada Performance, video art, prod. TVNS, 1992
Impossible Made in Serbia I (with FIA), video art, prod. MS Pentagram, 1993
Impossible Made in Serbia II (with FIA), video art, prod. Studio B, Idea Plus, 1994
Absolutely Dead (with APSOLUTNO), video art, prod. Digitel Studio, 1995
Eyewitness, video art, prod. RadioB92, 1996
A Look At The Wall, documentary, prod. RadioB92, 1996
Good Evening (with APSOLUTNO), video art, prod. Magic Box, 1996
Putting Our Best Foot Forward, documentary, prod. RadioB92, 1997
255 Hits, documentary, prod. Aleksandar Davić, 1999
Under The Authority Of The Police, documentary, prod. urbaNS, 2001
The Travelling Of The Dead, documentary, prod. urbaNS, 2001
The Party, feature film, prod. Arbos, 2004
NS Roulette, short fiction, prod. Davic production, 2012
The Golden Boy, short fiction, prod. Davic production, 2015
Our Historical Avantgarde, documentary, prod. Roremachine, 2020

Theatre
In 2009 Davić directed a theatre play The Crazy Locomotive by Stanisław Ignacy Witkiewicz, production of The Youth Theatre in Novi Sad, Serbia.

Awards
Authors' Award and Critics' Award, Yugoslav TV Festival Neum in 1991 for Punishment and Freedom
Special Award for Experimental Video, Yugoslav Festival of Short and Documentary Film/Video Belgrade in 1994 for Impossible Made in Serbia II
Golden Prize of Belgrade for Best Experimental Video, Yugoslav Festival of  Short and Documentary Film/Video Belgrade in 1996 for Eyewitness
Special Award of Magazine Gazeta Wyborcza, Media Art Biennale WRO97, Wroclaw, Poland in 1997 for Eyewitness
Special Prize, Dokufest Prizren in 2003 for The Travelling Of The Dead
Best Screenplay Award, Screenplay Festival Vrnjačka Banja, Serbia in 2005 for The Party
Best Film Award, Festival du Film Serbe, Paris, France in 2006 for The Party

Other
Aleksandar Davić was co-curator with Gordana Nikolić on the project Technology to the people! (case study: film and video in Vojvodina). The project was conceived as an exhibition, series of screenings, lectures, presentations and discussions on specific conditions of film, video and television productions in Vojvodina during the 20 and early 21 century. The exhibition was held at the Museum of Contemporary Art Vojvodina in Novi Sad, Serbia from February till April 2013.

Personal life
Aleksandar Davić was a fan of the American baseball team the San Francisco Giants. He died of bladder cancer.

References

External links
 Davić at the Internet Movie Database
 Aleksandar Davic
 Davic Production

 1961 births| Living people
1961 births
Serbian screenwriters
Male screenwriters
Living people